Eucereon striata is a moth of the subfamily Arctiinae. It was described by Herbert Druce in 1889. It is found in Mexico, Costa Rica and Rio de Janeiro, Brazil.

References

 

striata
Moths described in 1889